Filippo Zappata (6 July 1894 – 30 August 1994) was an Italian engineer and aircraft designer.

Zappata was born in Ancona. He worked for Gabardini, Cantieri Riuniti dell'Adriatico (CANT), Blériot, Breda, and Agusta, In the 1930s he designed a series of successful multi-engined hydroplanes such as the CANT Z.501 flying boat, CANT Z.506 floatplane, and CANT Z.1007 medium bomber. In association with test pilot Mario Stoppani, Zappata's designs flew 15 first flights and set 41 world aeronautical records.

In the 1940s he designed a large four-engined airliner, the Breda-Zappata BZ.308, but the project was abandoned and never produced.

He died at Gallarate in 1994 at the age of 100.

Endnotes

Sources
 Franks, Norman; Guest, Russell; Alegi, Gregory. Above the War Fronts: The British Two-seater Bomber Pilot and Observer Aces, the British Two-seater Fighter Observer Aces, and the Belgian, Italian, Austro-Hungarian and Russian Fighter Aces, 1914–1918: Volume 4 of Fighting Airmen of WWI Series: Volume 4 of Air Aces of WWI. Grub Street, 1997. , .

1894 births
1994 deaths
People from Ancona
Italian aerospace engineers
Italian centenarians